Panorama9 is a cloud-based service within enterprise Network management. The service is provided by the company of the same name and is a cloud-based remote monitoring and management RMM [Remote_monitoring_and_management] service which consists of a hosted Dashboard displaying the status of all devices on an enterprise's network and also provides a set of reports on inventory on both hardware, software and users. The service operates by collating data transmitted from agents installed on each monitored device.

In November 2011 the service introduced an interactive network map displaying real-time information.

In May 2012 Zendesk and Panorama9 announced a partnership.

In 2014 an MSP Managed services Control Panel was introduced for service providers which enables MSP's to manage multiple clients from one dashboard.

In 2017 a mobile app was released.

The company
The company operating the service has the same name, Panorama9, and was founded in Copenhagen and later moved their headquarters to San Francisco, California with some sales and development teams continuing from Copenhagen

See also
Software Asset Management
IT Asset Management
SNMP
List of mergers and acquisitions by Symantec

References

External links

American companies established in 2010
System administration
Network management
Port scanners
Network analyzers
2010 establishments in California